Dženis Burnić (born 22 May 1998) is a German professional footballer who plays as a midfielder for 1.

Club career

Borussia Dortmund
Burnić is an academy graduate of Borussia Dortmund. In January 2015, aged 16, he was invited by manager Jürgen Klopp to join the senior squad for their winter training camp in La Manga. Three months later, he extended his youth contract until 2018, with the deal becoming professional in nature upon his 18th birthday. “Escudo” Burnić was handed his debut for the senior side by Thomas Tuchel, who had replaced Klopp the season before, when he appeared as a stoppage time substitute for Felix Passlack in a 2–1 Champions League win over Sporting CP in October 2016. He made his Bundesliga debut on 11 February 2017, starting at centre-back in a 2−1 loss against Darmstadt, in what was his only other senior appearance for the season. He spent the majority of the campaign representing Dortmund's youth sides, however, where he captained the U19 team to the 2017 league title.

Loan to VfB Stuttgart
On 10 July 2017, Burnić was loaned out to VfB Stuttgart until the end of the season. Upon arriving at the club, he was reunited with manager Hannes Wolf with whom he had previously played under in Dortmund's U19 team. He made his debut for the club on 12 August, starting in the left-back position following a pre-match injury to Timo Baumgartl in a penalty shootout win over Energie Cottbus in the DFB Pokal. His league debut followed on 19 September when he came on as a second-half substitute for Orel Mangala in a 2–0 loss to Borussia Mönchengladbach. Early in November, he received his first-ever red card when he was sent off for two bookable offences in a 3–1 loss to Hamburg.

Loan to Dynamo Dresden
On 31 January 2019, Burnić joined Dynamo Dresden on loan until the end of 2018–19 season.

Transfer to 1. FC Heidenheim 1846
On 3 August 2020 Burnić joined 1. FC Heidenheim 1846 on a permanent deal.

International career
Burnić was born in Germany and is of Bosnian descent. He is a youth international for Germany.

He was called up to Germany U21 for the first time in August 2019 for matches against Greece U21 and Wales U21. On 5 September, he made his debut in the friendly match against Greece.

Career statistics

Club
 

1 Includes DFB Pokal matches. 
2 Includes UEFA Champions League matches.

References

External links

1998 births
Living people
German footballers
German people of Bosnia and Herzegovina descent
Association football midfielders
Bundesliga players
Borussia Dortmund players
VfB Stuttgart players
Dynamo Dresden players
1. FC Heidenheim players
Germany youth international footballers
Sportspeople from Hamm
2. Bundesliga players
Regionalliga players
Germany under-21 international footballers
Footballers from North Rhine-Westphalia